Field Hockey at the 2018 Summer Youth Olympics was held from 7 to 14 October. The events took place at the Parque Polideportivo Roca in Buenos Aires, Argentina. For the second Youth Olympics in a row, the format for this event was Hockey 5s, a 5-a-side tournament that is played on a smaller field size.

Qualification

Initially, 10 teams per tournament were scheduled to take part; however, on 6 July 2017 the International Hockey Federation announced the tournaments will be expanded to 12 teams. As hosts, Argentina qualified in both tournaments. Five continental tournaments were scheduled with two nations qualifying to the Youth Olympics. The 12th and final team was determined through a draw where the third best team qualified from the continent qualified. Should a nation decline it would go to the third best team in another continent. The results of the random draw (and priority) for the boys’ tournament was Oceania > Asia > Europe > Africa and Pan American while the results for the girls’ tournament was Africa > Asia > Europe > Oceania > Pan America.

To be eligible to participate at the Youth Olympics athletes must have been born between 1 January 2000 and 31 December 2003. Also nations (excluding Argentina) may only qualify in one team sport (Beach Handball, Futsal, Hockey5s or Rugby Sevens) per gender.

Boys

France and South Africa qualified in boys' field hockey and rugby sevens, opting to send their respective latter. Austria and Kenya respectively were listed by the IHF as participating in their place.
Solomon Islands decided to compete in futsal and thus the quota was reallocated to the third best placed team from Asia, Bangladesh.

Girls

Schedule

The schedule was released by the FIH and Buenos Aires 2018 Youth Olympic Games Organising Committee. Each day during the group stage will contain six boys' matches and six girls' matches.

All times are ART (UTC-3)

Medal summary

Medal table

Events

References

External links
Official Results Book – Hockey 5s

 
2018 Summer Youth Olympics events
Youth Summer Olympics
2018
2018 Summer Youth Olympics